Walang Panginoon is a 1989 Philippine political action drama film written and directed by Mauro Gia Samonte. The film stars Jestoni Alarcon, Rita Avila, Robert Arevalo and Joonee Gamboa.

Plot
Crispin (Jestoni), son of a poor tenant, falls in love with Loreta (Rita), the sole heir to hacienda Montemayor, against her father's (Joonee) wishes. Unknown to Crispin, Loreta is pregnant with his child.

Cast
 Jestoni Alarcon as Crispin Maglaya
 John Regala
 Rita Avila as Loreta Montemayor
 Bobby Zshornack
 Leo Lazaro
 Robert Arevalo
 Aurora Sevilla as Estrella
 Michael Locsin
 Harlene Bautista
 Joonee Gamboa as Loreta's Father
 Alicia Alonzo
 Rez Cortez
 Mario Escudero
 E.R. Ejercito as Ka Berong
 Rusty Santos

References

External links

1989 films
1989 action films
Filipino-language films
Philippine action films
Philippine political films
Seiko Films films
Films directed by Mauro Gia Samonte